Mississinawa Valley High School is a public high school in Union City, Ohio.  It is the only high school in the Mississinawa Valley Schools district.

Notable alumni
Curtis Enis - former running back for the Chicago Bears and Clopay employee.
Chris Hawkey - morning host on the Power Trip radio show on KFXN-FM in Minneapolis and lead singer of the Chris Hawkey Band, former lead singer for country band Rocket Club

Notes and references

External links
 District Website

High schools in Darke County, Ohio
Public high schools in Ohio